The Pimpama River is a perennial river located in the South East region of Queensland, Australia.

Course and features
The river flows generally north-easterly, joined by two minor tributaries before emptying into Tipplers Passage where it is joined by the North Branch of the Coomera River in the Southern Moreton Bay Islands National Park and south of Woogoompah Island. From here the river forms its confluence with the Broadwater, part of the southern Moreton Bay and enters the Coral Sea either south or north of South Stradbroke Island.

The catchment area of the Pimpama River is bounded by the Logan and Albert rivers catchment to the north, the Coomera River catchment to the south and the Broadwater in the east. The name of the river was the source for the  naming of nearby . The Gold Coast railway line crosses to the east between Pimpama and Ormeau.

A conservation area is located on the southern bank of the river at its junction with Moreton Bay, bordering the Southern Moreton Bay Island National Park and the Ramsar wetland site.  The Pimpama River wetlands has mangroves, saltmarshs and marine flats providing protected breeding grounds for marine species including four frog species and the vulnerable false water rat (Xeromys myoides). The wetlands are an important conservation area for a recorded 184 species of native plants, 134 vertebrate fauna species including 13 species of mammals, 108 species of birds and nine species of reptiles.

History
Like most other coastal rivers in the region, the river was used to transport timber cut during the 18th century. Growing sugarcane has become the area's main land use.

A bridge was first constructed over the Pimpama River between late 1871 and early 1872 by John Thomas Brigg.

In 2015, the remains of Tiahleigh Palmer were found in the river.

See also

References

Rivers of Queensland
Geography of Gold Coast, Queensland
Pimpama, Queensland